Neolamprologus niger is a species of cichlid endemic to Lake Tanganyika where it is only found along the northern shores.  It is a crevice-dweller and feeds on molluscs.  This species reaches a length of  TL.  It can also be found in the aquarium trade.

References

Neolamprologus
Fish of Lake Tanganyika
Fish described in 1956
Taxa named by Max Poll
Taxonomy articles created by Polbot